Joseph Simatupang Ferguson (born 28 December 2002) is a footballer who plays as a right-back for Marine.

Personal life
Born in Manchester, Ferguson is of Batak descent through his Indonesian mother. He has expressed his desire to represent Indonesia at international level, and met with the Ambassador of Indonesia to the United Kingdom, Desra Percaya, in April 2022 to discuss this possibility.

Club career
Ferguson joined the Blackburn Rovers at the age of eleven. He signed a scholarship contract in 2019, at the age of sixteen.

In December 2021, Ferguson joined Northern Premier League side Witton Albion on a one-month loan deal. After impressing, this loan was extended into February 2022.

He was released by Blackburn Rovers at the end of the 2021–22 season. He then signed for Matlock Town, where he did not make a competitive appearance before signing for Marine.

International career
Ferguson contacted the Indonesian FA ahead of the 2021 FIFA U-20 World Cup, which was due to be hosted in Indonesia, to see if he could represent the Indonesian team at the competition. However, the tournament was cancelled due to the COVID-19 pandemic.

Career statistics

Club

Notes

References

2002 births
Living people
Footballers from Manchester
English people of Indonesian descent
People of Batak descent
English footballers
Indonesian footballers
Association football defenders
Northern Premier League players
Blackburn Rovers F.C. players
Witton Albion F.C. players
Matlock Town F.C. players
Marine F.C. players